Damir Zeljko (born 13 July 1992) is a Serbian football forward playing for NK Rudar Mursko Središće in Croatia.

Career
Born in Novi Sad, Damir started his career playing for local club Veternik. Later he played for Donji Srem, ČSK Čelarevo and Cement Beočin.

He was part of the "Croats from Serbia" team at the 2016 EUROPEADA games.

Honours
Donji Srem
Runners-up: Serbian First League: 2011–12

References

External links
 
 Damir Željko at utakmica.rs
 Damir Željko at footballdatabase.eu

1992 births
Living people
Footballers from Novi Sad
Croats of Vojvodina
Association football forwards
Serbian footballers
Serbian expatriate footballers
FK Veternik players
FK Donji Srem players
FK Cement Beočin players
FK ČSK Čelarevo players
NK Nafta Lendava players
NK Međimurje players
Serbian SuperLiga players
Serbian First League players
Slovenian Second League players
Serbian expatriate sportspeople in Slovenia
Expatriate footballers in Slovenia